Sun Guoxiang (born February 1965) is a former Chinese politician who spent his entire career in his home-province Liaoning. He was investigated by China's top anti-graft agency in June 2022. Previously he served as vice chairman of Liaoning Provincial People's Congress. He was a delegate to the 11th National People's Congress.

Biography
Sun was born in Andong County (now Donggang), Liaoning, in February 1965. He joined the Chinese Communist Party (CCP) in 1985.

He was appointed secretary of Liaoning Provincial Committee of the Communist Youth League of China in November 2002, concurrently serving as president of Liaoning Youth Federation since March 2003. In February 2008, he was named acting mayor of Panjin, confirmed in January 2009. He rose to become party secretary, the top political position in the city, in August 2010. In September 2016, he was transferred to Anshan and appointed party secretary. He took up the post of vice chairman of Liaoning Provincial People's Congress which he held from January 2018 to June 2022, although he remained party secretary of Anshan until October 2018.

Downfall
On June 2, 2022, he has been placed under investigation for "serious violations of laws and regulations" by the Central Commission for Discipline Inspection (CCDI), the party's internal disciplinary body, and the National Supervisory Commission, the highest anti-corruption agency of China. On August 30, he was expelled from the CCP and removed from public office.

References

1965 births
Living people
People from Donggang, Liaoning
Dongbei University of Finance and Economics alumni
People's Republic of China politicians from Liaoning
Chinese Communist Party politicians from Liaoning
Delegates to the 11th National People's Congress